NCRE may refer to:

National Competitive Recruitment Examination
Renewable energy